Southwold Pier is a pier in the coastal town of Southwold in the English county of Suffolk. It is on the northern edge of the town and extends  into the North Sea.

Whilst many English seaside piers are in decline, Southwold Pier is enjoying renewed popularity. It includes a collection of modern coin-operated novelty machines designed and constructed by the inventor Tim Hunkin.

History
The pier was built in 1900 as a landing stage for steamships that brought tourists from London Clacton and Great Yarmouth until the 1930s.

The ownership of the pier transferred from that of the Coast Development Company following its winding up in 1906, to The Amusement Equipment Company.

The landing stage of the pier was destroyed during a storm in 1934, with the T-shaped end being swept away. An addition to the pier of a concert hall and amusement arcade was made during 1937 at the shore end of the pier.

During the Second World War the pier had a section removed due to the fear of its use during an invasion. Further damage occurred from an impact with a mine. The pier was rebuilt after the war at a cost of £30000.

In 1960, a part of the pier pavilion was transformed into the Neptune Bar public house.

Parts of the pier were further restored during 1987 where additional work was carried out to both the theatre and function room. After the reconstruction the pier then reopened in December 1988.

Restoration
The pier was bought by Chris Iredale in 1987 and he first spent five years turning the pavilion into a profit-making business.
A major refurbishment program was started in 1999 in order to rebuild the pier. This was completed to a design by Brian Haward ARIBA AABC Architect of The Rope House Southwold and constructed by Nick Haward [Southwold] Limited in 2001 almost 100 years after it was first opened. This additional length now allows the pier to accommodate visits by Britain's only surviving sea-going steam passenger ship, the PS Waverley paddle steamer and its running mate the MV Balmoral.

Attractions

The pier is home to several shops and attractions including traditional souvenir shops, cafés, restaurants  and amusement arcades.

The Under The Pier Show
Since 2001 the pier has hosted an arcade with a range of automata, machines and games designed by Tim Hunkin. Tim originally approached the owner of the pier after his original location for one of his arcade games drew local complaints

Awards
2002 National Piers Society - Pier of the Year

Gallery

References

External links

The Southwold Pier website
History of Southwold Pier

Piers in Suffolk
Tourist attractions in Suffolk
Southwold